Priya Bapat (born 18 September 1986) is an Indian actress who mainly works in Marathi films. She is best known for her roles in the movies Kaksparsh and Aamhi Doghi, for which she won the Best Actress award at the Screen Awards in 2013, and Happy Journey, for which she won the Best Actress Maharashtra State Award and was nominated in the Best Actress category at the Marathi Filmfare Awards in 2014.

Biography 
Bapat was born on 18 September 1986 in Mumbai, Maharashtra, India. She completed her bachelor's degree in Mass Communication from Ruia College. She married fellow actor Umesh Kamat in 2011.

Career 
She made her debut with Dr.Babasaheb Ambedkar movie in 2000. She is also remembered for her roles in Munnabhai MBBS and Lage Raho Munnabhai. Bapat's role in Kaksparsh and Timepass 2 acclaimed good reviews from critics. She was also seen in many serials such as Shubham Karoti, Vicky Ki Taxi, Abhalmaya etc. She also appeared in the 2009 movie Me Shivajiraje Bhosale Boltoy where she played the role of Shashikala Bhosale. She has done many roles in movie Andhali Koshimbir, Happy Journey, Vazandar, Time Please. She played the lead role in Mayanagari- City of dreams as Pournima Rao Gaikwad.

The actress has also collaborated with her elder sister Shweta Bapat, a costume designer, to help the Indian weaver community through their clothing venture "Sawenchi".

Filmography

Films

Theater

Television

Web series

References

External links

 

1986 births
Living people
Indian film actresses
Actresses in Marathi cinema
Marathi people
Actresses in Hindi cinema
Indian television actresses
Actresses from Mumbai
21st-century Indian actresses